Systomus jacobusboehlkei is a species of cyprinid fish native to the lower Mekong and Chao Phraya Basins of Cambodia, Vietnam, Laos, and Thailand. It inhabits marshlands and floodplains, swamps, and small, slow-flowing tributaries. It is present in local food fisheries, along with other small species. This species can reach a length of  SL.

References

Systomus
Fish of the Mekong Basin
Fish of Cambodia
Fish of Laos
Fish of Thailand
Fish of Vietnam
Fish described in 1958
Taxa named by Henry Weed Fowler